Apocalyptic Love is the second solo studio album by guitarist Slash. However, it is also the first studio album billed to Slash feat. Myles Kennedy & The Conspirators. The band features vocalist Myles Kennedy, bassist Todd Kerns and drummer Brent Fitz in addition to Slash on guitar. Produced by Eric Valentine, it was released on May 22, 2012.

History and recording 
During his first solo world tour, Slash announced his second studio album. Unlike his self-titled debut solo album, which featured a variety of singers including Chris Cornell, Ozzy Osbourne, M. Shadows, and Kid Rock, he said his second album would feature Alter Bridge vocalist Myles Kennedy as the sole singer. Kennedy had previously appeared on two songs from Slash's first album, and was later the vocalist of Slash's band on tour. Slash later said that his second album would be more of a collaboration album with Kennedy, and said he was unsure whether it would be released under his own name or a new name entirely.

Slash began working on his second solo album in June 2011, and that December, three songs—"Halo", "Standing in the Sun" and "Bad Rain"—had been recorded. Slash described the new material as "very heavy". The album was finished in February 2012 and was given a May 22, 2012, release date. The first single, "You're a Lie", was released to rock radio on February 27, 2012; a 30-second preview of the song was released online with this announcement. Slash released the track listing for the album on March 5, 2012. Kennedy, who wrote the lyrics, has said that some of the lyrics on the album are about his past negative experiences with drugs.

On March 26, 30 second samples from "Apocalyptic Love" were made available on Amazon.com. It is an "internet rumor" according to Slash that the lead intro riff for "Anastasia" takes inspiration from Johann Sebastian Bach's Toccata and Fugue in D minor, which Slash interpolates live in his version of "Speak Softly Love".

Release and reception

The album debuted at number two on the Canadian Albums Chart, selling 7,500 copies. The number one album for the week was John Mayer's Born and Raised, with 17,800 copies.

The album received mixed reviews from critics. On Metacritic, it has a score of 62 out of 100, based on 13 reviews. Writing for Artistdirect, Rick Florino gave an enthusiastic review, awarding the album 5 out of 5 stars and stating that it "embodies every side of Slash", featuring "some of the man's most incendiary and infectious playing yet". He also praises Myles Kennedy's vocals and cites "Anastastia" and "Far and Away" as standout tracks, praising their orchestral and cinematic elements. 

Brandon Geist of Revolver also gave a positive review of the album, giving it a 4 out of 5 rating. Geist compares the album to Slash's solo début, which he criticised for sometimes seeming "strained under the weight of its creator’s own grand ambition", whereas on Apocalyptic Love, Slash's band "let the riffs and hooks fly freely". He concludes that the album is "a collection of lean, high-octane rock-and-roll tunes".

Stephen Thomas Erlewine gave a more mixed opinion of the album in his review for AllMusic, awarding it 3 out of 5 stars. He observes that performing with Kennedy "clearly is easier on Slash's soul" compared to the vocalists in Slash's previous bands, and that the music on the album "reflects this ease". He criticises the album for containing "absolutely no surprises" but adds that it "never tries too hard, so it winds up satisfying on its own limited scale." 

Another 3/5 rating came from Johan Wippsson, writing for Melodic.net, who wrote that the album "is far better" than Slash's debut, praising the decision to have Kennedy perform on all tracks, though admitting that he "had expected better songs".

Track listing

Personnel
Slash – lead guitar, acoustic guitar, talkbox on "Carolina"
Myles Kennedy – lead vocals, rhythm guitar
Todd Kerns – bass, backing vocals, screams on "You're a Lie"
Brent Fitz – drums

Miscellaneous

The whole album was recorded with analog equipment only.
"Apocalyptic Love" is the first song that Slash and Myles Kennedy worked on together on this album.
"Anastasia" was written from a riff Slash played on stage during the Slash 2010–11 World Tour.
Myles Kennedy recorded some guitar blues licks for "Far and Away".
Slash, Myles and The Conspirators also worked on two more songs which stayed demos.
Apocalyptic Love debuted at number 4 on the Billboard 200, selling 38,000 copies in its first week of release.
Tracks 6 and 7 on the Live at Guitar Center CD are mislabeled on the box and on the CD sleeve as being "Starlight" and "Not for Me" respectively. The tracks are in the opposite order on the CD itself.
The Album includes a 40 minute DVD titled "The Making of Apocalyptic Love" which explores a behind the scenes look at the Making of the Record.

Charts

Weekly charts

Year-end charts

Certifications

References

External links 
 

2012 albums
Slash (musician) albums
Albums produced by Eric Valentine